Zeki Demir (born June 6, 1982 in Istanbul, Turkey) is a European champion Turkish karateka competing in the kumite -80 kg division. He is a member of the İstanbul Büyükşehir Belediyesi S.K.

His younger brother İdris Demir is also a national karateka competing in the kumite -65 kg weight class.

Achievements
2008
  19th World Championships - November 13, Tokyo JPN - kumite team

2006
  41st European Championships - May 5, Stevanger NOR - kumite -80 kg 
  41st European Championships - May 5, Stevanger NOR - kumite team

2004
  11th Balkan Senior Karate Championships - March 13 - kumite team

2002
  9th Balkan Senior Karate Championships - September 28 - kumite -70 kg 
  29th European Karate Cadet & Junior Championships - February 15 - kumite junior -70 kg

2001
  2nd World Karate Cadet & Junior Championships - October 12 - kumite junior team

References

1982 births
Sportspeople from Istanbul
Living people
Turkish male karateka
Istanbul Büyükşehir Belediyespor athletes
21st-century Turkish people